Kayle is a surname and unisex given name. As a Yiddish feminine given name, Kayle originated as a variant of Keyle, meaning "merry"; it is cognate with the modern German word . Kayle is also a variant of the masculine given name Kale, which may have originated as an Anglicisation of the Irish name Cathal, or as a masculine equivalent of Kaylee; other variants include Caile, Cayle, Cale, Kaile, and Kail. The 2000 United States Census found 104 people with the surname Kayle, making it the 146,011th-most-common name in the country. About nine-tenths of the bearers of the surname identified as non-Hispanic white, with small numbers identifying as Black or Asian, but none as Hispanic.

People with the given name Kayle include:
Kayle Short (born 1973), Canadian ice hockey player
Kayle Leogrande (born 1977), American road racing cyclist
Kayle Connor (born 1990), Australian rugby league player
Kayle van Zyl (born 1991), South African rugby union player
Kayle Browning (born 1992), American sport shooter
Kayle Kirby (born 1998), Australian rules footballer

People with the surname Kayle include:
Hugh Kayle (died 1604), English goldsmith
Kortney Wilson (born 1979), American country music singer who used the stage name Kortney Kayle for two single releases

See also
McKayle, a surname
Kailey, a surname and given name

References

Irish masculine given names
Jewish feminine given names